This is a list of early microcomputers sold to hobbyists and developers. These microcomputers were often sold as "DIY" kits or pre-built machines in relatively small numbers in the mid-1970s.  These systems were primarily used for teaching the use of microprocessors and supporting peripheral devices, and unlike home computers were rarely used with pre-written application software. Most early micros came without alphanumeric keyboards or displays, which had to be provided by the user. RAM was quite small in the unexpanded systems (a few hundred bytes to a few kilobytes). By 1976 the number of pre-assembled machines was growing, and the 1977 introduction of the "Trinity" of Commodore PET, TRS-80 and Apple II generally marks the end of the "early" microcomputer era, and the advent of the consumer home computer era that followed.

Discrete logic
Before the advent of microprocessors, it was possible to build small computers using small-scale integrated circuits (ICs), where each IC contained only a few logic gates or flip-flops.
 The Kenbak-1 (1971) used small scale integration transistor-transistor logic (TTL) ICs and had 256 bytes of memory.  It was priced at USD 750 and sold only 40 units.
 Datapoint 2200 (shipped 1971) was the first machine designed to use a microprocessor, but when Intel could not deliver the 8008 in time, they released the machine using discrete logic.
 The Educ-8 (1975) was an Electronics Australia magazine project describing a computer built from TTL ICs.

Test and development machines
As microprocessors were developed, companies often released simple development systems to bootstrap the use of the processor. These systems were often converted by hobbyists into complete computer systems.

Intel's Intellec computers were a series of early microcomputers Intel produced starting in the 1970s as a development platform for their processors.

Kits
Many early microcomputers were available in Electronic kit form. Machines were sold in small numbers, with final assembly by the user. Kits took advantage of this by offering the system at a low price point. Kits were popular, beginning in 1975, with the introduction of the famous Altair 8800, but as sales volumes increased, kits became less common. The introduction of useful fully assembled machines in 1977 led to the rapid disappearance of kit systems for most users. The ZX81 was one of the last systems commonly available in both kit and assembled form. 

Some magazines published plans and printed circuit board layouts from which a reader could in principle duplicate the project, although usually commercially made boards could be ordered to expedite assembly. Other kits varied from etched, drilled, printed circuit boards and a parts list to packages containing cases, power supplies, and all interconnections.  All kits required significant assembly by the user.

Complete microcomputers
A number of complete microcomputers were offered even before kits became popular, dating to as far back as 1973. For some time there was a major market for assembled versions of the Altair 8800, a market that grew significantly through the late 1970s and into the early 1980s. The introduction of three computers aimed at personal users in 1977, the Radio Shack TRS-80, Apple II, and Commodore PET, significantly changed the market and led to the home computer revolution.

 MicroSystems International's CPS-1, using a locally produced microprocessor based on the design of the Intel 4004. First built in 1972, a small number shipped in early 1973.
 Micral N (1973) was awarded the title of "the first personal computer using a microprocessor" by a panel at the Computer History Museum in 1986.
 Sord Computer Corporation's SMP80/08, based on the Intel 8008, was announced in early 1973, but never commercially released. It was followed by the SMP80/x, which debuted in May 1974 and used the Intel 8080.
 MCM/70 was a 1974 Intel 8008-based design, primarily designed to run APL. According to the IEEE Annals of Computer History, the MCM/70 is the earliest commercial, non-kit personal computer.
 IBM 5100 was an early portable computer with integrated monitor; the 5100 was possibly the first portable microcomputer. Many people think the famous IBM PC (the 5150) was IBM's first micro but there were a number of microcomputer models released by IBM beginning in 1975.
 The Digital Group was the first company to produce mostly complete systems, both as kits and assembled, built around the Zilog Z80 processor in 1975. Their products also included options for MOS 6502 and Motorola 6800 processors. The company began providing computer cases in 1978.
 Sphere 1, a 1975 personal computer that was among the earliest complete all-in-one microcomputers that could be plugged in, turned on, and be fully functional.
 Processor Technology's Sol-20, offered both as kit and assembled, but the vast majority were sold assembled
 ECD Micromind, introduced 1977 MOS Technology 6512 (6502 w/ external clock).
 MPT8080 Microtutor, an Intel 8080–based microprocessor trainer introduced 1977.  As recently as 2008, it remained in academic use.  As of 2011, the MPT8080 was still available for sale.
 Tesla PMI-80
 Ohio Scientific Model 500, 1978, 6502
 Exidy Sorcerer, 1978, Z80
 Explorer/85 8085, 1979
 ComPAN 8 was a Polish microcomputer in the 1980s designed in the Institute of Industry Automation Systems PAN in Gliwice and produced in the MERA-ELZAB factory in Zabrze.

See also 
 List of home computers
 List of home computers by video hardware
 Microprocessor development board
 Microcomputer Associates, Incorporated

References

Notes

A cached copy of the Department of Physics (2008-10-06). "Machine code programming" can be found on the internet archive at:
 https://web.archive.org/web/20100216174218/http://kcl.ac.uk/content/1/c6/02/14/60/2ndyearmanual2008-2009lab1.pdf

External links
 Obsolete technology website — Information about many old computers.

 
List of early microcomputers
Early microcomputers
Early microcomputers